The following is a timeline of the history of the city of Nairobi, Kenya.

Prior to 20th century

 1899 - Uganda Railway (Mombasa-Nairobi) begins operating; depot built by British.

20th century

1900s-1920s
 1900 - Incorporated as the Township of Nairobi
 1901 
Native Civil hospital opens.
The Nairobi Club established
 1904 - Norfolk Hotel opens.
 1905
 British East Africa Protectorate capital moves from Mombasa to Nairobi.
 Nairobi Parsee Zoroastrian Anjuman Religious and Charitable Funds established.
 1906
 Jamia Mosque construction started.
 Royal Nairobi Golf Club founded.
 1907 - British Government House built.
 1909 - East Africa and Uganda Natural History Society established.
 1910
 East African Standard newspaper headquartered in Nairobi.
 Museum of the East Africa and Uganda Natural History Society established.
 1912 - Theatre Royal opens.
 1913 - Muthaiga Country Club founded.
 1914 - Shri Vankaner Vidya Prasarak Mandal established.
 1917
 Anjuman Islamia established.
 East Africa Women's League established.
 Indian Christian Union formed.
 1918 - Punjebhai Club formed.
 1919 - Nairobi Political Association formed.
 1920
 Social Service Volunteer Corps established.
 Majlis-i-Ahl-i-Kashmeer established.

1930s-1950s
 1930 - Coryndon Museum opens.
 1931 - McMillan lending library (for white settlers) opens.
 1934 - Sir Ali Muslim Club (cricket) founded.
 1935 - Nairobi becomes a municipality.
 1939 - St. Mary's School founded.
 1944 - Kenya Conservatoire of Music founded.
 1946 - Nairobi National Park established.
 1947 - Kenya National Archives headquartered in city.
 1948
 East African Literature Bureau founded.
 Population: 118,976 (urban agglomeration).
 1949 - American Center Library established.
 1950 - Nairobi became a city
 1951 - Railway rerouted via Kibera
 1952
 City Council formed.
 Princess Elizabeth Hospital opens.
 1953 - Nairobi Dam constructed.
 1954
 Legislative Council (Legco) Building opened
 Ngong Racecourse opens.
 European Hospital opens.
 1955
Israel Somen elected mayor.
 Government Indian School renamed Duke of Gloucester School
 1956
 Royal Technical College established.
 East African Library Association headquartered in city.
 1958
 Nairobi Embakasi Airport opened
 Embassy Cinema opened.
 Thika Rd Drive-In (later renamed Fox Drive-In) opened
 Kenya Cinema opened
 New Donovan Maule Theatre opened
 Aga Khan Hospital opened

1960s-1970s
 1961 - Kenya Polytechnic established.
 1962 - Nairobi West Airport renamed Wilson Airport
  1963
 City becomes capital of Republic of Kenya.
 Kenya School of Law established.
 1964 - Abaluhya United Football Club founded.
 1966 - United Nations Office at Nairobi established.
 1967
 National Library Service of Kenya headquartered in city.
 Kenya Open golf tournament begins.
 1968
 Gor Mahia Football Club founded.
 Swedish school founded.
 1969
 July: Political leader Tom Mboya assassinated.
 Hilton Nairobi built.
 1970
 University of Nairobi and Nairobi Japanese School established.
 Margaret Kenyatta becomes mayor.
 Tusker Football Club founded.
 1971 - Nairobi Railway Museum opens.
 1973
 Kenyatta International Conference Centre and National Social Security Fund building constructed.
 City administrators develop municipal "master plan."
 Population: 630,000 urban agglomeration.
 1975
 Uchumi Supermarkets founded.
 City hosts World Council of Churches conference.
 1978 - Mazingira Institute founded.

1980s-1990s
 1980 - Nairobi Records Centre of the Kenya National Archives established.
 1981
 City hall building expanded.
 ICEA Building and Cooperative Bank House built.
 1983
 Sarit Centre shopping mall opens.
 Nyayo National Stadium and Nyayo House built.
 Phoenix Players theatre troupe active.
 1985
Kenyatta University established.
Third UN World Conference on Women held from 15 to 26 July 1985
 1987
 Moi International Sports Centre built.
 City hosts All-Africa Games.
 1989 - Kenya College of Accountancy founded.
 1990
 Kenya Television Network founded.
 Lonrho House built.
 Population: 1,380,000 (urban agglomeration).
 1992 - Anniversary Towers built.
 1994 - Mathare United Football Club founded.
 1995 - The Village Market shopping center opens.
 1998 - U.S. embassy bombed.
 1997 - Kenya Institute for Public Policy Research and Analysis headquartered in city.
 1999
 Rahimtulla Tower built.
 Nairobi Java House opens.
 2000
 New Central Bank Tower built.
 Population: 2,230,000 (urban agglomeration).

21st century

2000s

 2001
 I&M Bank Tower built.
 Nairobi Women's Hospital founded.
 Coalition for Peace in Africa headquartered in Nairobi.
 Unrest in Kibera.
 2002
 Kiriri Women's University of Science and Technology established.
 World Urban Forum held.
 2003
 Nairobi Marathon begins.
 Dorman's Coffee opens.
 Kwani? literary journal begins publication.
 GoDown Arts Centre founded.
 2004 - Dick Wathika elected mayor.
 2005
 July: Political protest.
 Population: 2,814,000 (urban agglomeration).
 2006 - www.sheng.co.ke Kenya's first online Sheng Dictionary goes live after major overhaul.
 2007
 Nairobi Province administrative districts created.
 December - Post-election unrest.
 2008
 Google office in business.
 Nairobi National Museum building expanded.
 2009 - Population: 3,138,369.

2010s

 2010
 Mayor Geoffrey Majiwa resigns.
 City hosts African Championships in Athletics.
 IHub opens.
 June: Blast occurs during protest in Uhuru Park.
 Population: 3,109,861 (estimate).
 2011
 Petrol pipeline explosion, Sinai slum.
 Hay Festival of literature held.
 George Aladwa elected mayor.
 2012
 Nairobi-Syokimau railway begins operating.
 IMAX Nairobi (cinema) opens.
 Sister city relationship established with Raleigh, US.
 2013
 Nairobi County administrative division effected.
 4 March: Election held for governor and National Assembly.
 7 August: Nairobi airport fire.
 September: 2013 Women's African Volleyball Championship held.
 21–24 September: Westgate shopping mall attack.
 14 December: Bus attack in Eastleigh.
 2014 - Caramel restaurant in business.
 2015 - July: US president Obama visits city.
 2017 
 Two Rivers Shopping Complex at the northern boundary shopping centre of Ruaka opened
 June 1-The first phase of the Mombasa–Nairobi Standard Gauge Railway, built by the China Road & Bridge Construction Company mainly funded by China Exim Bank and the Government of Kenya is inaugurated by President Uhuru Kenyatta.
 2018 - Part of 2018 African Nations Championship football contest to be played in Nairobi.

See also
 History of Nairobi
 List of mayors of Nairobi, 1923-2012
 Timelines of other cities in Kenya: Mombasa

References

Bibliography

  (Memoir set in Nairobi area circa 1920s)

External links

 
  (Bibliography of open access  articles)
  (Images, etc.)
  (Images, etc.)
  (Images, etc.)
  (Bibliography)
  (Bibliography)
  (Bibliography)
  (Bibliography)
 U.S. Library of Congress. Photos of Nairobi, various dates.
 
 

Timeline
Nairobi
nairobi
Years in Kenya
Nairobi